Mohamed Hédi Lakhoua (1872-1949) was a Tunisian politician. A native of Tunis, he died in that city. He served as Prime Minister of Tunisia from 1932 until 1942.

Biography 
Mohamed Hédi Lakhoua comes from a family of the Tunisian upper middle class of Moorish origin who has provided a long line of master craftsmen of Chechia among the most famous of the country; his father however follows an administrative career prolonged by his descent. After graduating from Sadiki College [1], he held several positions such as secretary at the general directorate of public education, between 1890 and 1892, and secretary-interpreter at the Tunis Municipality from 1892. He was editor and then deputy chief of office, before being called to the general administration in 1913 then, in 1916, as head of section to the accounting. Delegate of the mayor of Tunis Khelil Bouhageb in 1922, he served as head of the state section before being appointed minister of the pen in November 1926.

In 1927, he was made commander of the Legion of Honor.

References
http://www.elpais.com/articulo/andalucia/elite/morisca/boneteros/elpepiespand/20050129elpand_35/Tes?print=1

Prime Ministers of Tunisia
People from Tunis
1872 births
1949 deaths